Leck is an unincorporated community in Dickenson County, Virginia, in the United States.

History
A post office was established at Leck in 1901, and remained in operation until it was discontinued in 1961. It was named for Elexius "Leck" Smith, a settler.

References

Unincorporated communities in Dickenson County, Virginia
Unincorporated communities in Virginia